In Disney theme parks, the utilidor system is a system of some of the world's largest utility tunnels, mainly for Walt Disney World's Magic Kingdom in Florida.  The utilidors, short for utility corridors, are a part of Disney's "backstage" (behind-the-scenes) area. They allow Disney employees ("cast members") to perform park support operations, such as trash removal, and for costumed characters to quickly reach their destinations on the surface out of the sight of guests to avoid ruining the illusion that is being created.

These tunnels were first built for Magic Kingdom. Smaller utilidor systems are built under the central section of Epcot's Future World, primarily beneath Spaceship Earth and Innoventions, and formerly at Pleasure Island. Disneyland, in California, also has a small utilidor system running throughout Tomorrowland.

History
According to modern legend, Walt Disney was bothered by the sight of a cowboy walking through Disneyland's Tomorrowland en route to his post in Frontierland. He felt that such a sight was jarring and it detracted from the guest experience. Since Disneyland was small, such a tunnel system could not be feasibly implemented. When the new Florida Disney park was being planned, engineers designed utilidors to keep park operations out of guests' sight.

Magic Kingdom utilidor system
The largest system of utilidors is beneath Walt Disney World's Magic Kingdom, but they are not a basement, contrary to popular belief. Because of an elevated water table, most of these tunnels were actually built at ground level, and the Magic Kingdom was built above that. All the guests of the park see streets that are elevated by one story. Parts of Fantasyland, including the Cinderella Castle, are at a third-story level. The ground's incline is so gradual that guests tend not to realize they are ascending to the second and third stories. The Magic Kingdom is built upon soil which was removed from what is now the Seven Seas Lagoon.

The utilidors can be accessed from a main tunnel entrance located behind Fantasyland, or through unmarked doors throughout the theme park. Some shops, restaurants and attractions have direct access to the utilidors.

Cast members navigate the tunnels on foot or in battery-powered vehicles that resemble golf carts. Gasoline-powered vehicles are not allowed in the utilidors, with the exception of armored cash pickup trucks and, in extreme emergencies, ambulances.

Guests are not allowed in the utilidors, unless they purchase the "Keys to the Kingdom" tour.

Functions
The utilidors have been referred to as an "underground city", the functions of which include:

 Waste removal: The Magic Kingdom uses an automated vacuum collection (AVAC) system for waste removal. Custodians remove trash from the park twenty-four hours a day, then dump it into AVAC system processors throughout the park. The trash then travels through pneumatic tubes to a central location where it is processed and compressed for transfer to a landfill or recycling plant.
 Electrical operations: The park's computer system, the Digital Animation Control Systems (DACS), is operated and monitored from control rooms in the utilidors. This system monitors everything in the park, from sound systems to attractions, Audio-Animatronic figures to parades, fire prevention and security systems to cash registers.
 Deliveries and storage warehouses: Deliveries are received, processed, and stored at the utilidors until use. This ensures that guests do not see delivery trucks, nor do they see cast members carting merchandise through the park.
 Food service: The park's cooking and prep kitchens are housed in the utilidors.
 Costuming: For years, the park's costuming department (for cast members and Audio-Animatronic figures) was located in the utilidors. Over 1.2 million costumes were housed here, making it the largest operating wardrobe department in the world. In 2005, Disney replaced this facility with a larger location in the cast members' parking lot, West Clock. The only costuming operations that remain in the utilidors today are for costumed characters.
 Cast member services: Separate locker rooms for men and women are located in the utilidors, as well as cast member cafeterias. There is also a check cashing service, an employee hair salon called "Kingdom Kutters", rehearsal rooms, and administrative offices.
 Emergency services: Two medical carts are housed in the utilidors and are deployed whenever there is a medical emergency in Magic Kingdom.

See also
Dartford Cable Tunnel
Underground city
Utility vault

References

External links
 Disneys Magic Kingdom Utilidors Map
 Fun Facts About the Utilidors

Magic Kingdom
Epcot
Disneyland
Walt Disney World
Disneyland Resort
Subterranea (geography)
Tunnels